The Quartzites et Poudingues de Trémentines is a geologic formation in France. It preserves fossils dating back to the Cambrian period.

See also

 List of fossiliferous stratigraphic units in France

References
 

Geologic formations of France
Cambrian System of Europe
Cambrian France
Quartzite formations
Formations